The Amphitrite class was a group of eight submarines built for the French Navy just before World War I and completed during the war.

Ships

See also 
List of submarines of France

Bibliography

 

 
Submarine classes
World War I submarines of France
Ship classes of the French Navy